A Twosome Place, is a coffeehouse chain based in South Korea and was owned by the CJ Foodville of CJ Group until 2020. It is now owned by Anchor Food Group that bought the remaining shares from CJ in 2020. As of 2014, the coffee chain had over 500 retail stores in South Korea. The chain expanded its franchise to China in 2011, and has grown to 30 outlets in China as of 2018. On February 1, 2018, A Twosome Place was incorporated into CJ Foodville coffee business.

Following Starbucks Coffee Korea, A Twosome Place is the second biggest coffee chain in Korea with 910 stores as of 2019.

About
A Twosome Place is a European-style dessert café in which the name implies a place where an individual, lover, friends or companies can enjoy being together. The name refers to the slogan: "A cup of coffee, TWO of us, SOME dessert, PLACE". It offers a wide assortment of premium beverages including coffee and tea and desserts such as mousse, tiramisu, crème brûlée, among others.

History
It started with the launch of the A Twosome Place (투썸플레이스) brand in 2002, and started the franchise business in 2009. In 2010, it achieved 100 chain stores. 2011 opened its first new franchise in China, not in Korea. Twosome Place has had nearly 100 franchises each year and opened its first complex store in Ridu, China's  in 2012. In 2016, the company opened the 'Roastery cafe', a flagship store for modern people who can enjoy special coffee and dessert, as well as a place to see the process of roasting beans and making Cold Brew.

At present, it has 1,000 stores in Korea and 45 overseas stores. It ranks No. 1 in profits at Korean franchises except Starbucks.

Except for Starbucks, which operates only direct stores, Twosome Place's sales are ranked No. 1 in Korean cafe sales. In addition, since the introduction of TWG in 2014, sales have increased by more than 60%. In addition, a total of 180 billion won in overseas investment was realized by raising 50 billion won through the issuance of new shares after selling 130 billion won in shares to ordinary shares in February 2018.

Spokesperson
Aiming towards the Chinese market, actor Lee Min-ho was contracted as the store's model in 2014.

References

External links

Coffee Magazine
Coffee Machine Comparison

Coffee brands
South Korean brands
Coffeehouses and cafés in South Korea
Companies based in Seoul